Joanna Łochowska (born November 18, 1988 in Zielona Góra) is a Polish weightlifter. She competed at the 2012 Summer Olympics in the Women's 53 kg, finishing 11th.

Major results

References

External links
 

Polish female weightlifters
1988 births
Living people
Olympic weightlifters of Poland
Weightlifters at the 2012 Summer Olympics
Weightlifters at the 2020 Summer Olympics
People from Zielona Góra
Sportspeople from Lubusz Voivodeship
European Weightlifting Championships medalists
20th-century Polish women
21st-century Polish women